is a Japanese scientist. He was the president of University of Tokyo from April 2005 to March 2009. He is also the chairman of Mitsubishi Research Institute. His major research fields are Chemical engineering, Environmental engineering, functional material science and CVD reaction engineering. He is member of the World Knowledge Dialogue Scientific Board. When he was an undergraduate, he belonged to the American football club at University of Tokyo.

Biography
 On December 15, 1944, he was born in Tochigi Prefecture.
 In 1963, he graduated from Tokyo Metropolitan Toyama High School in Tokyo.
 In 1967, he graduated the Chemical Engineering course of Engineering department, University of Tokyo.
 In 1972, he got Ph.D the School of Chemical Engineering, University of Tokyo 
 In December 1972, he was hired by University of Tokyo (assistant professor)
 In 1977, he became a lecturer at University of Tokyo
 In 1981, he became Assistant Professor at University of Tokyo
 In July 1988, he became a Professor at University of Tokyo
 In April 2000, he became the head of Engineering Department at University of Tokyo
 In 2002, he became the president of Society for Chemical Engineers of Japan.
 In 2003, he became a vice president of University of Tokyo.
 In 2005, he became the 28th president of University of Tokyo.
 In 2013, he became a judge for the Queen Elizabeth Prize for Engineering.

Awards
Komiyama was awarded the Sheikh Mohammed bin Rashid Al Maktoum Knowledge Award in 2017.

Writings
Vision 2050: Roadmap for a Sustainable Earth, published by Springer Science+Business Media, 2008. .
, published by Iwanami Shoten Publishing, December 1999. .
, published by University of Tokyo Press, December 1999. .

External links
Message from the president (University of Tokyo)
 Global Green Growth Institute

References

1944 births
Japanese scientists
Japanese chemical engineers
Living people
Presidents of the University of Tokyo
University of Tokyo alumni